Minnie Island State Park is a public recreation area occupying a tiny island at the southern end of  Gardner Lake that is split by the townline between  Salem and Montville, Connecticut. It is accessible only via boat and offers opportunities for picnicking and fishing as well as general exploration in a largely deserted setting. The  island is the state's smallest state park.

History
In the 19th century, the island was owned by a popular music teacher, the founder of Salem's Music Vale Seminary, Oramel Whittlesey (1801-1876). Whittlesey named the island for a niece nicknamed Minnie. In the 1920s, an attempt by squatters to take possession led to the discovery that although the island was claimed by both Salem and Montville, it was not on the tax rolls of either town. In solving the dilemma, the state assembly rejected the squatters' proposed legislation, instead passing a law in 1925 that took possession of the island for the state and turned its management over to the state park's commission.

Features
Writers working for the WPA in the 1930s described Minnie Island as "a pine-grown knoll rising from the lake's depths." It has a steep shoreline with gray outcropped ledges that offers few opportunities for docking. The island is thickly forested with mountain laurel undergrowth amidst large red oaks. A clearing at the summit may be littered with the detritus of previous visitors. There are no facilities of any kind and no signage.

References

External links
 Minnie Island State Park Connecticut Department of Energy and Environmental Protection

State parks of Connecticut
Salem, Connecticut
Montville, Connecticut
Parks in New London County, Connecticut
Islands of Connecticut
Landforms of New London County, Connecticut
Protected areas established in 1925
1925 establishments in Connecticut